Brampton is a civil parish in the North East Derbyshire district of Derbyshire, England.  The parish contains 37 listed buildings that are recorded in the National Heritage List for England.  Of these, one is listed at Grade I, the highest of the three grades, three are at Grade II*, the middle grade, and the others are at Grade II, the lowest grade.  The parish contains the villages of Cutthorpe, Old Brampton, and Wadshelf, and the surrounding countryside.  Most of the listed buildings are houses and associated structures, farmhouses and farm buildings.  The other listed buildings include a church, a chapel, and two guide posts.


Key

Buildings

References

Citations

Sources

 

Lists of listed buildings in Derbyshire